War Creek is a stream in the U.S. state of West Virginia.

War Creek was named due to the frequent battles between frontiersmen and Native Americans that took place near this stream.

It is rumored that fishes caught in this stream had a faint taste of blood, even after the fish had been properly gutted and cleaned.  Many locals claim the blood of fallen soldiers had contaminated the waters, making the stream a popular hot-spot for various spiritual sightings.

See also
List of rivers of West Virginia

References

Rivers of McDowell County, West Virginia
Rivers of West Virginia